Claude Bessy (20 June 1945 – 2 October 1999), also known as Kickboy Face, was a French writer, magazine editor, singer, video producer, and painter. He is noted as an early organizer in the Los Angeles punk scene in the mid 1970s and was involved in the British post-punk scene in the 1980s.

Biography
Bessy was born in Normandy, France. 
Bessy was kicked out of the Sorbonne after showing up drunk at nine in the morning, brandishing a bottle of brandy, and threatening a teacher. Bessy moved to the US in 1966 and to Los Angeles in 1967. 
Bessy later left for Afghanistan to "deal" hashish. 
Bessy later detoxed from methedrine in a French asylum. 
In 1970 Bessy returned to Los Angeles, finding work as a busboy in Santa Monica, a waiter, other jobs. and founded Angeleno Dread, L.A.'s first reggae fanzine.

In May 1977 he helped Steve Samiof launch the monthly punk rock magazine Slash, which he edited until it ceased publication in 1980.

As Kickboy Face (a pen name adopted from, Kick Boy Face a song and album by Prince Jazzbo), Bessy was the lead singer for the band Catholic Discipline, the film The Decline of Western Civilization includes a Bessy interview, and two songs.

"The scene was not fun anymore, so I bailed on L.A. and the USA, never to return the day Ronald Reagan was elected." — Claude Bessy

Bessy left California in November 1980. moving with his lifelong partner Philomena Winstanley to the U.K. where he landed a job as a press officer at Rough Trade record label. There he championed American groups such as Gun Club and Panther Burns.

In 1982 Bessy was hired as the resident VJ at The Haçienda in Manchester. He went on to produce music videos and films for The Virgin Prunes, The Fall and William S. Burroughs, and work with Factory Records' Ikon FCL video label, producing a Factory Records Christmas video trailer Bessy Talks Turkey.

Bessy returned to London where he worked for Forbidden Planet and wrote record sleeve notes. He contributed vocals to records by Sonic Youth, Howard Devoto, Wire's Graham Lewis and trumpeter Marc Cunningham.

In 1987 Bessy moved to Barcelona, Spain where he took to painting and earned a living teaching English. He died of lung cancer in 1999.

Discography 
 Unanswerable Lust (1988), Luxuria
 Trying To Make It To The End Of The Century (1991) 
 The First Letter (1991) Wire
 "Adios Jupiter" (1994) Raeo
 Underground Babylon (2004) Catholic Discipline

Filmography 
 "Barbee Doll Lust" – The Decline of Western Civilization (January 19, 1980)
 "Underground Babylon" – The Decline of Western Civilization (January 19, 1980)

Further reading 
 Bessy, Claude; Cervenka, Exene; Morris, Chris; Carillo, Sean; Doe, John (1999). Forming: The Early Days of L.A. Punk. Santa Monica, CA: Smart Art Press, 95 pp., illustrated.
 Track 16 Gallery exhibition
 
 
 
 
 Mark Vallen. Portrait of Claude Bessy 1979. Acrylic on paper. 22" x 30"
  John Potwora, "Harmony In Disharmony: Spike Jones As A Punk Rock Prototype" 2019
 John Savage, "England’s Dreaming: Anarchy, Sex Pistols, Punk Rock, and Beyond" New York: St. Martin’s Press, 1992
  dissertation, Ph.D., History PDF Open access

See also 
 Jenny Lens

References

External links
 
 Claude Bessy at IMDb

1945 births
1999 deaths
French magazine editors
French writers about music
Writers from Normandy
French rock singers
French expatriates in the United States
French expatriates in the United Kingdom
French expatriates in Spain
French film producers
French male non-fiction writers
20th-century French male singers
Deaths from lung cancer in Spain
20th-century French male writers